NTP is a three-letter initialism which may stand for:

Politics
 Nation Transformation Party, a political party in Papua New Guinea
 National Toxicology Program, part of the United States Department of Health and Human Services
 National Transport Plan, a ten-year plan of Norway
 Ninh Thuận Province, a province in Vietnam
 Northern Territory Police, the police force in the Northern Territory of Australia

Science and technology

Aerospace
 Nuclear thermal propulsion, a rocket technology

Chemistry
 Normal temperature and pressure, in chemistry
 Nucleoside triphosphate, an organic compound and building block of nucleic acids

Computing
 Network Time Protocol, a means of synchronizing clocks over a computer network

Other uses
 National Toxicology Program, USA
 New Teacher Project, a US non-profit organization 
 Norsk Teknisk Porselen, Norwegian ceramics manufacturer
 NTP, Inc., an American company founded by inventor Thomas J. Campana Jr. that licensed its patents to BlackBerry for US$612.5 million

See also